The Wales national football team represents Wales in international association football and is governed by the Football Association of Wales (FAW). Between 1900 and 1914 the side played 45 matches, all against the other national teams of the Home Nations in the British Home Championship. Having struggled in the competition prior to 1900, the Welsh side started the 20th century with considerably more success. They recorded two second-place finishes and winning their first Championship in the 1906–07 tournament in which they won their opening two matches before drawing with England in their final fixture, while Wales' Lot Jones was the competition's top goalscorer. 

This was followed, however by an immediate downturn as they finished bottom of the competition a year after their victory. A second-place finish in the 1908–09 championship was the highest-placed result Wales subsequently achieved during the time period. In March 1912, Wales played their 100th official international fixture, losing 1–0 against Scotland at Tynecastle Park. The decision was taken to halt the competition in December 1914 after the outbreak of World War I and Wales did not play another competitive fixture until February 1920.

Of the 45 matches the team played between 1900 and 1914, they won 11, defeating Ireland 7 times and Scotland 4 times, including their first victory over the latter at the 30th attempt. In the remaining 34 fixtures, Wales drew 11 and lost 23. They failed to beat England in 15 attempts. The team's inconsistent performances were partly attributed to the reluctance of Football League sides to release Welsh players for international duty, with FAW secretary Ted Robbins being highly critical of both the league and its teams during the period.

Results
Wales' score is shown first in each case. The colours listed below are also used to signify results combined with the scoreline.

Head to head records

Notes

References 
Statistics
 
 
 

Bibliography

Specific

1900s in Wales
1910s in Wales
1800s